Gene Raymond (born Raymond Guion; August 13, 1908 – May 3, 1998) was an American film, television, and stage actor of the 1930s and 1940s. In addition to acting, Raymond was also a singer, composer, screenwriter, director, producer, and decorated military pilot.

Early life
Raymond was born August 13, 1908 in New York City. He attended the Professional Children's School while appearing in productions like Rip Van Winkle and Mrs. Wiggs of the Cabbage Patch. His Broadway debut, at age 17, was in The Cradle Snatchers which ran two years. (The cast included Mary Boland, Edna May Oliver, and a young Humphrey Bogart.)

Film career
His screen debut was in Personal Maid (1931). Another early appearance was in the multi-director If I Had a Million with W. C. Fields and Charles Laughton. With his blond good looks, classic profile, and youthful exuberance – plus a name change to the more pronounceable "Gene Raymond" – he scored in films like the classic Zoo in Budapest with Loretta Young, and a series of light RKO musicals, mostly with Ann Sothern. He wrote a number of songs, including the popular "Will You?" which he sang to Sothern in Smartest Girl in Town (1936). His wife, Jeanette MacDonald, sang several of his more classical pieces in her concerts and recorded one entitled "Let Me Always Sing".

His most notable films, mostly as a second lead actor, include Red Dust (1932) with Jean Harlow and Clark Gable, Zoo in Budapest (1933) with Loretta Young, Ex-Lady (1933) with Bette Davis, Flying Down to Rio (1933) with Dolores del Río, Fred Astaire and Ginger Rogers, I Am Suzanne (1934) with Lilian Harvey, Sadie McKee (1934) with Joan Crawford, Alfred Hitchcock's Mr. and Mrs. Smith (1941) with Carole Lombard and Robert Montgomery, and The Locket (1946) with Laraine Day, Brian Aherne, and Robert Mitchum. MacDonald and Raymond made one film together, Smilin' Through, which came out as the U.S. was on the verge of entering World War II.

After service in the United States Army Air Forces Raymond returned to Hollywood. He wrote, directed and starred in the 1949 film Million Dollar Weekend. In later years he appeared in only a few films. His last major film was The Best Man in 1964 with Henry Fonda and Cliff Robertson.

In the 1950s he mostly worked in television, appearing in Playhouse of Stars, Fireside Theatre, Hollywood Summer Theater and TV Reader's Digest. In the 1970s he appeared on ABC Television Network's Paris 7000 and had guest roles in The Outer Limits, Robert Montgomery Presents, Playhouse 90, The Man from U.N.C.L.E., Ironside, The Defenders, Mannix, The Name of the Game, Lux Video Theatre, Kraft Television Theatre and U.S. Steel Hour.

Military service
Following the beginning of World War II in Europe in 1939, Raymond felt certain the U.S. would eventually enter the war. He trained as a pilot for that eventuality, and after the attack on Pearl Harbor in 1941, he was commissioned a lieutenant in the Army Air Forces. He served as an observer aboard B-17 anti-submarine flights along the Atlantic coast before attending intelligence school and shipping out to England in July 1942. He served with the 97th Bomb Group before taking over as assistant operations officer in the VIII Bomber Command. He was transferred back to the U.S. in 1943 and piloted a variety of aircraft, both bombers and fighters, in stateside duties.  He remained in the United States Air Force Reserve following the war, retiring in 1968 as a colonel, awarded with a Legion of Merit for his efforts during the Vietnam War.

Personal life
Raymond was notorious in Hollywood for being outspoken against the studio system, saying that it was not "living up to expectations". The only actors that he had faith in were Fred Astaire and Ginger Rogers, two people that he claimed "knew what they were doing". He was one of the first actors of the time to go freelance, although he admitted that it was mostly to spite the studios.

He also excelled at sports, such as gymnastics and tennis. George Sidney once called Raymond "the most gorgeous thing the world had ever seen".

Raymond married Jeanette MacDonald in 1937. He met her at a Hollywood party two years earlier at Roszika Dolly's home; MacDonald agreed to a date, as long as it was at her family's dinner table. Despite the strong relationship, Raymond's mother did not like MacDonald, attempting to snub her a few times (such as arranging her son with Janet Gaynor as a plus one at a charity ball), and did not attend the wedding. 

The Raymonds lived in a 21-room Tudor Revival mansion named Twin Gables with their pet dogs, birds and their horse White Lady, which Raymond gave to MacDonald as a birthday present; after MacDonald's death, it was briefly owned by John Phillips and Michelle Phillips from The Mamas and Papas. 

MacDonald often worried about her husband's self-esteem. Although she appreciated his support, MacDonald wished that their success was equal; when Raymond turned down her offer to join one of her music tours, she did not feel let down: "Trailing along on my tours would make him 'Mr. MacDonald', a galling label for any self-respecting man. As it was, he was called 'Mr. MacDonald' often enough to make me admire tremendously his good sportsmanship in taking it on the chin." Raymond was sometimes mistaken for Nelson Eddy by MacDonald's fans and passersby, which MacDonald later admitted that she never liked either: "Of course we always laughed it off—sometimes Gene even obliged by signing Nelson's name—but no one will ever know the agonies I suffered on such occasions. More than anything else in the world those days, I wanted to see him receive as much acclaim as I, to spare him these humiliations." When she reunited with Maurice Chevalier in 1957, he asked her why she had retired from films, to which she replied, "Because for exactly twenty years I've played my best role, by his [Raymond's] side. And I'm perfectly happy." The two of them were married for almost 28 years until MacDonald's death in 1965.

Despite rumors of getting close with Jane Wyman, in 1974, Raymond married Nelson Bentley Hees and they lived together in Pacific Palisades. Hees died from Alzheimer's in 1995.

Raymond devoted time to Jeanette MacDonald's International Fan Club, befriending president Clara Rhoades, and taking a few members out to lunch annually. His last public appearance was June 27, 1997, at the 60th-anniversary banquet of the Fan Club at Beverly Wilshire Hotel.

He was a Republican and supported Barry Goldwater in the 1964 United States presidential election.

During the time of the Hollywood Blacklist, he and MacDonald did not involve themselves with the HUAC investigations; neither were ever summoned to a hearing (MacDonald openly disagreed with the situation in a radio interview).

On May 3, 1998, at 89 years of age, Raymond died of pneumonia at the Cedars-Sinai Medical Center in Los Angeles, California. His body was interred next to Jeanette MacDonald's in the Freedom Mausoleum at Forest Lawn, Glendale.

Legacy
For his contributions to the motion picture and television industries, Gene Raymond has two stars on the Hollywood Walk of Fame located at 7001 Hollywood Boulevard (motion pictures) and 1708 Vine Street (television).

Controversy

Sexuality and abuse allegations

Biographer Sharon Rich reported in her Nelson Eddy and Jeanette MacDonald biography, Sweethearts, that Raymond and MacDonald had a rocky marriage.  This began on their honeymoon when MacDonald allegedly discovered Raymond in bed with Buddy Rogers. Sharon Rich was friends with MacDonald’s sister Blossom Rock and knew Raymond as well.

Biographer E. J. Fleming alleged that Eddy had confronted Raymond for abusing MacDonald, who was visibly pregnant with Eddy’s child while filming Sweethearts which ended with Eddy attacking him and leaving him for dead, reported incorrectly by newspapers as Raymond recovering from falling down the stairs. Raymond was physically unable to father children and MacDonald alluded to this fact in her unfinished autobiography, writing that she returned from her Hawaii honeymoon with Raymond with the knowledge and accurate admittance that "The MacRaymonds had no children." Nevertheless MacDonald had additional later documented pregnancies while married to Raymond, all of which ended in miscarriage.

MacDonald's 1963 desk diary was sold at auction in 2015. Despite public statements over the years by both MacDonald and Raymond defending their marriage, the handwritten pages reveal that MacDonald and Raymond lived in separate bedrooms or apartments and that MacDonald’s health rapidly failed, with her weight noted daily and at times under 100 pounds. She writes of verbal abuse from Raymond, physical neglect, and being left alone for 44 days during the year until the diary ends on November 1, 1963, the date she flew to Houston Methodist Hospital for heart surgery.

Filmography
Features:

Personal Maid (1931) - Dick Gary
Ladies of the Big House (1931) - Standish McNeil
Forgotten Commandments (1932) - Paul Ossipoff
The Night of June 13 (1932) - Herbert Morrow
Red Dust (1932) - Gary Willis
If I Had a Million (1932) - John Wallace (uncredited)
Zoo in Budapest (1933) - Zani
Ex-Lady (1933) - Don Peterson
Ann Carver's Profession (1933) - William 'Bill' 'Lightning' Graham
Brief Moment (1933) - Rodney Deane
The House on 56th Street (1933) - Monty Van Tyle
Flying Down to Rio (1933) - Roger Bond
I Am Suzanne (1933) - Tony Malatini
Coming Out Party (1934) - Chris Hansen
Sadie McKee (1934) - Tommy Wallace
Transatlantic Merry-Go-Round (1934) - Jimmy Brett
Behold My Wife (1934) - Michael Carter
The Woman in Red (1935) - John 'Johnny' Wyatt
Transient Lady (1935) - Carey Marshall
Hooray for Love (1935) - Douglas Tyler
Seven Keys to Baldpate (1935) - William Magee
Love on a Bet (1936) - Michael MacCreigh
The Bride Walks Out (1936) - Michael Martin
Walking on Air (1936) - Pete Quinlan, aka Count Pierre Louis de Marsac
Smartest Girl in Town (1936) - Richard Stuyvesant Smith
That Girl from Paris (1936) - Windy McLean
There Goes My Girl (1937) - Reporter Jerry Martin
The Life of the Party (1937) - Barry
She's Got Everything (1937) - Fuller Partridge
Stolen Heaven (1938) - Carl Lieberlich
Cross-Country Romance (1940) - Dr. Lawrence 'Larry' Smith
Mr. & Mrs. Smith (1941) - Jeff Custer
Smilin' Through (1941) - Kenneth 'Ken' Wayne / Jeremy 'Jerry' Wayne
The Locket (1946) - John Willis
Assigned to Danger (1948) - Dan Sullivan
Sofia (1948) - Steve Roark
Million Dollar Weekend (1948, also director and writer) - Nicholas Lawrence
Hit the Deck (1955) - Wendell Craig
Plunder Road (1957) - Eddie Harris
The Best Man (1964) - Don Cantwell
I'd Rather Be Rich (1964) - Martin Wood
The Hanged Man (1964, TV Movie) - Whitey Devlin
Five Bloody Graves (1970) - Voice of Death (voice)

Short films

Hollywood on Parade No. B-8 (1934) - Himself
Hollywood on Parade No. B-13 (1934) - Himself
Screen Snapshots Series 14, No. 9 (1935) - Himself
Screen Snapshots Series 15, No. 5 (1936) - Himself
Screen Snapshots Series 18, No. 1 (1938) - Himself
Screen Snapshots: Hollywood in Uniform (1943) - Himself

References

Bibliography

External links

Gene Raymond at Virtual History

1908 births
1998 deaths
American male musical theatre actors
American male radio actors
American television directors
American male screenwriters
Songwriters from New York (state)
Deaths from pneumonia in California
Burials at Forest Lawn Memorial Park (Glendale)
20th-century American male actors
American film directors
20th-century American singers
California Republicans
Screenwriters from New York (state)
20th-century American male singers
United States Army Air Forces officers
United States Army Air Forces bomber pilots of World War II
United States Air Force reservists
United States Air Force colonels
20th-century American male writers
20th-century American screenwriters
American male songwriters